IFRS 17 is an International Financial Reporting Standard that was issued by the International Accounting Standards Board in May 2017.  It will replace IFRS 4 on accounting for insurance contracts and has an effective date of 1 January 2023.  The original effective date was meant to be 1 January 2021. In November 2018 the International Accounting Standards Board proposed to delay the effective date by one year to 1 January 2022. In March 2020, the International Accounting Standards Board further deferred the effective date to 1 January 2023.

List of insurance contracts to which IFRS 17 applies：

 Insurance and reinsurance contracts issued by an insurer;
 Reinsurance contracts held by an insurer;
 Investment contracts with discretionary participation features (DPF) issued by an insurer, provided the insurer also issues insurance contracts.

Under the IFRS 17 general model, insurance contract liabilities will be calculated as the expected present value of future insurance cash flows with a provision for non-financial risk.  The discount rate will reflect current time value of money adjusted for financial risk.  If the risk-adjusted expected present value of future cash flows would produce a gain at the time a contract is recognized, the model would also require a "contractual service margin" to offset the day 1 gain.  The contractual service margin would be released to insurance revenue over the life of the contract.  There would also be a new income statement presentation for insurance contracts, including a conceptual definition of revenue, and additional disclosure requirements.

For short-duration insurance contracts, insurers are permitted to use a simplified method, aka. Premium Allocation Approach ('PAA'). Under this simplified method, insurance liability is similar to premium unearned (less insurance acquisition cash flows).

Some insurance contracts include participation features where the entity shares the performance of underlying items with policyholders in an extent that the remaining profit of the insurer has the character of a contractual fee. IFRS 17 has a specific accounting approach for such participating contracts, defined as ‘insurance contracts with direct participation features’. That approach is referred to as the variable fee approach (‘VFA’).

Several features of IFRS 17 have been criticized by preparers. One example is the volatility caused by applying current rates for time value of money. IFRS 17 permits presenting the effects of changes in the discount rate under Other Comprehensive Income to eliminate the volatility from the P&L.

Former IASB chairman Hans Hoogervorst regarded the use of a current discount rate as one of the benefits of the new standard, stating that by doing otherwise "the devastating impact of the current low-interest-rate environment on long-term obligations is not nearly as visible in the insurance industry as it is in the defined benefit pension schemes of many companies."  He also stated that current discount rates would "increase comparability between insurance companies and between insurance and other parts of the financial industry, such as banks and asset management."  Other benefits Hoogervorst saw in the new standard were increased consistency across companies in accounting for insurance contracts and a more theoretically valid measurement of revenue.

In November 2021 EU has adopted IFRS 17 with an exemption regarding the limitation of aggregating contracts for purposes of subsequent measurement of the contractual service margin, the so-called groups of insurance contracts; under IFRS 17 contracts may be only aggregated in groups which were issued not more than one year apart. This limitation is optional to be applied in the EU.

2020 Amendments
On 26 June 2019, the IASB released an exposure draft proposing several amendments. Comments on the amendments were open for three months, closing on 25 September 2019.  In total, 123 submissions were received.  In June 2020 the IASB adopted the final set of amendments and deferred the effective date of the standard to January 1, 2023.

External links
IFRS17 text 
IFRS17 on ifrs.org

References

International Financial Reporting Standards
Actuarial science
Insurance